SMS  was the second  built by the German  (Imperial Navy) before World War I. Ordered as a replacement for the old protected cruiser ,  was launched on 29 November 1913, but not completed until 1916.  was a sister ship to  from which she differed slightly in that she was armed with an additional pair of 15 cm (5.9 inch) secondary guns and had an additional watertight compartment in her hull. She was named in honor of the Prussian general Ludwig Adolf Wilhelm von Lützow who fought in the Napoleonic Wars.

 was commissioned on 8 August 1915, but did not join I Scouting Group until 20 March due to engine damage during trials. This was after most of the major actions conducted by the German battlecruiser force had taken place. As a result,  saw very little action during the war. She took part in only one bombardment operation: the Bombardment of Yarmouth and Lowestoft on 24–25 April 1916, after which she became Admiral Franz von Hipper's flagship. One month later, the ship was heavily engaged during the Battle of Jutland, on 31 May–1 June. During the battle,  sank the British battlecruiser  and is sometimes given credit for sinking the armored cruiser . However, she was heavily damaged by an estimated 24 heavy-caliber shell hits. With her bow thoroughly flooded, the ship was unable to make the return voyage to Germany; her crew was evacuated and she was sunk by torpedoes fired by one of her escorts, the torpedo boat .

Design

The  class was authorized for the 1911 fiscal year as part of the 1906 naval law; design work had begun in early 1910. To keep costs from growing too quickly, the number of guns was reduced from ten to eight, compared to the earlier , but a more efficient superfiring arrangement was adopted. , the second member of the class, was allocated to the 1912 construction program.

She was designed to displace  normally and she reached  at full load. The ship was powered by four Parsons steam turbines that drove four screw propellers. The ship had a crew that consisted of 44 officers and 1,068 to 1,138 enlisted men. While serving as the squadron flagship, her crew was augmented by an additional 14 officers and 62 enlisted men in the commander's staff.

s armament consisted of a main battery of eight 30.5 cm SK L/50 guns in four gun turrets, mounted in superfiring pairs fore and aft of the central superstructure. Her secondary armament consisted of fourteen 15 cm SK L/45 guns mounted in casemates at main deck level. She also carried eight 8.8 cm SK L/45 quick-firing guns in anti-aircraft mounts. The armament suite was rounded out with four  torpedo tubes, all placed in the hull, below the waterline.

Her secondary casemates received  of armor protection. The forward conning tower, where the ship's commander controlled the vessel, had 300 mm walls.

Service

Built by Schichau-Werke in Danzig, her keel was laid down in May 1912, and she was launched on 29 November 1913.  was commissioned on 8 August 1915 for trials, and was sent to Kiel on 23 August. There she completed her final fitting out, including her armament. On 13 September, she began her trials, including torpedo firing tests on 15 September and gunnery tests on 6 October. While on trials on 25 October, s port low-pressure turbine was badly damaged. Repairs were conducted in Kiel until late January 1916, after which the ship underwent further trials. These were finished on 19 February;  was assigned to I Scouting Group on 20 March, and arrived at her new unit four days later.

On 24 April,  and the battlecruisers  and  made a brief sortie into the North Sea, cruising to the eastern end of the Amrun Bank, since British destroyers had been reported to have been in the area. A second sweep followed two days later, also to the Amrun Bank. While on this operation, a British submarine attempted to torpedo  without success. (Rear Admiral) Friedrich Boedicker, the deputy commander of I Scouting Group, temporarily raised his flag aboard the ship from 29 March to 11 April. On 21–22 April,  joined the rest of the High Seas Fleet for a sortie into the North Sea that failed to locate any British warships.

Bombardment of Yarmouth and Lowestoft

 first major operation was the bombardment of Yarmouth and Lowestoft on 24–25 April. Franz von Hipper, the commander of I Scouting Group, was away on sick leave, so the German ships were under the command of Boedicker. The heavy units of the High Seas Fleet sailed at 13:40, with the objective to provide distant support for Boedicker's ships. The British Admiralty was made aware of the German sortie through the interception of German wireless signals, and deployed the Grand Fleet at 15:50.

In the meantime, by 14:00, Boedicker's ships had reached a position off Norderney, at which point he turned his ships northward to avoid the Dutch observers on the island of Terschelling. The four remaining battlecruisers turned south immediately in the direction of Norderney to avoid further mine damage. By 16:00,  was clear of imminent danger, so the ship stopped to allow Boedicker to disembark.

Boedicker refused to be distracted by the British ships, and instead trained his ships' guns on Lowestoft. The German battlecruisers destroyed two 6 in (15 cm) shore batteries and inflicted other damage to the town. In the process, a single 6 in shell from one of the shore batteries struck , but the ship sustained no significant damage.

At 05:20, the German raiders turned north, towards Yarmouth, which they reached by 05:42. The German ships turned back south, and at 05:47 encountered for the second time the Harwich Force, which had by then been engaged by the six light cruisers of the German screening ships. Boedicker's ships opened fire from a range of 12,000 m (13,000 yards). Tyrwhitt immediately turned his ships around and fled south, but not before the cruiser  sustained severe damage. Due to reports of British submarines and torpedo attacks, Boedicker broke off the chase and turned back east towards the High Seas Fleet. At this point, Admiral Reinhard Scheer, commander of the High Seas Fleet, turned back towards Germany, having been warned of the Grand Fleet's sortie from Scapa Flow.

Battle of Jutland

The reconnaissance force was screened by 30 torpedo boats of II, VI, and IX Flotillas, directed by the cruiser . An hour and a half later, the High Seas Fleet—under the command of Admiral Scheer—left the Jade with 16 dreadnoughts. The six pre-dreadnoughts of II Battle Squadron had departed from the Elbe roads at 02:45, and rendezvoused with the battle fleet at 5:00. The operation was to be a repeat of previous German fleet actions: to draw out a portion of the Grand Fleet and destroy it.

Opening actions

Shortly before 16:00, Hipper's force encountered Vice Admiral David Beatty's 1st Battlecruiser Squadron. The ship fired semi-armor-piercing (SAP) shells, unlike the other German battlecruisers, which had loaded armor-piercing (AP) shells instead. In the span of three minutes,  had fired four more salvos, alternating between the four forward and four aft guns, and had struck with the last one at 16:51.

 scored a second hit a minute later at 16:52. These two hits would prove to be very important, however, as  took on more water due to damage sustained later in the battle, since they allowed water to enter the ship above the armored deck. Nearly simultaneously,  dealt a tremendous blow to Lion; one of her 30.5 cm shells penetrated the roof of Lions center "Q" turret and detonated the munitions that were stored inside. Only by the resolute actions of the turret commander—Major Francis Harvey, who ordered the magazine be flooded—did the ship avoid a catastrophic magazine explosion. Indeed, approximately 30 minutes after the turret was destroyed, the fire in the turret spread to the working chamber that was directly above the magazine; there it detonated propellant charges that had been stored there. The resulting explosion would have likely destroyed the ship if the ammunition magazine had not been flooded.

At 17:03, the rearmost British battlecruiser, was struck by several shells from her opponent, . The forward ammunition magazines were penetrated and set on fire; the resulting explosion tore the ship apart. Shortly thereafter,  scored several more hits on Lion, though without serious damage being done. s gunnery officer, Günther Paschen, later regretted the decision to fire SAP shells, believing that had  fired AP rounds, she would have destroyed Lion during this action. In the course of the first nineteen minutes of the battle,  had fired thirty-one salvos at Lion, scoring six hits, forcing the latter to shear out of line temporarily. From 17:10 to 17:16,  resumed firing at Lion, but in the haze, her gunners believed they were engaging . At 17:24,  again opened fire at Lion and scored three more hits in the span of thirty seconds.

In an attempt to regroup his ships, Admiral Beatty sought to turn his ships away by 2 degrees while the s of the 5th Battle Squadron arrived on the scene and provided covering fire. Witnesses reported at least five shells from two salvos hit the ship, which caused an intense explosion that ripped the Queen Mary in half. Shortly after the destruction of Queen Mary, both British and German destroyers attempted to make torpedo attacks on the opposing lines. At 17:34,  launched a torpedo at the battlecruiser  without success.  scored another hit on Lion at 17:57, followed by three more hits, one of which started a fire in the aft secondary battery.

The leading ships of the German battle fleet had by 18:00 come within effective range of the British ships, and had begun trading shots with the British battlecruisers and Queen Elizabeth-class battleships. At 18:13, a  shell from one of the Queen Elizabeths struck ; two more hits came at 18:25 and 18:30. The ship was hit again at 18:45, probably by Princess Royal. The ship continued to engage the British battlecruisers as they steamed north toward the Grand Fleet, but had no success during this period. Later, at 19:05, she scored one hit on Lion. During the engagements between the combined German fleet and the British 1st Battlecruiser and 5th Battle Squadrons,  had both of her wireless transmitters damaged; after that point, the only method of communication between ships was via searchlight.

Battlefleets engage
Shortly after 19:00, the German cruiser  had become disabled by a shell from the battlecruiser ; the German battlecruisers made a 16-point turn to the northeast and made for the crippled cruiser at high speed. III Battle Squadron of the German fleet, which contained the most powerful battleships of the German navy, also altered course to assist . Simultaneously, the British III and IV Light Cruiser Squadrons began a torpedo attack on the German line; while advancing to torpedo range, they smothered  with fire from their main guns. Onslow was hit three times by s secondary battery and was forced to withdraw. Shortly thereafter, a second destroyer, Acasta launched a torpedo at  that missed; in return,  and  fired a barrage of 15 cm shells at Acasta, hitting her twice. Hipper initially hesitated, believing the ship was the German cruiser , but at 19:16,  (KzS) Harder, s commanding officer, ordered his ships' guns to fire. The other German battlecruisers and battleships joined in the melee;  fired five broadsides in rapid succession. In the span of less than five minutes, Defence was struck by several heavy-caliber shells from the German ships. One salvo penetrated the ship's ammunition magazines and, in a massive explosion, destroyed the cruiser.

While  and the rest of the fleet were concentrating on Defence, Lion scored two hits on Hipper's flagship, causing a serious fire. By 19:24, the 3rd Battlecruiser Squadron had formed up with Beatty's remaining battlecruisers ahead of the German line. In return, both  and  concentrated their fire on Invincible, and 19:33, s third salvo penetrated Invincibles center turret and ignited the magazine; the ship disappeared in a series of massive explosions. From this point onward,  came under no further fire from the British battlecruisers, though she was flooding badly from two of the hits from Invincible that had struck below the waterline.

By 19:30, the High Seas Fleet, which was by that point pursuing the British battlecruisers, had not yet encountered the Grand Fleet. Scheer had been considering retiring his forces before darkness exposed his ships to torpedo boat attack. He had not yet made a decision when his leading battleships encountered the main body of the Grand Fleet. This development made it impossible for Scheer to retreat, for doing so would have sacrificed the slower pre-dreadnought battleships of II Battle Squadron. If he chose to use his dreadnoughts and battlecruisers to cover their retreat, he would have subjected his strongest ships to overwhelming British fire. Instead, Scheer ordered his ships to turn 16 points to starboard, which would bring the pre-dreadnoughts to the relative safety of the disengaged side of the German battle line.

withdraws and sinks
The other battlecruisers followed the move, but  had lost speed and was unable to keep up. Instead, the ship tried to withdraw to the southwest to escape the punishing British gunfire. By 20:00, flooding in the forward part of the ship had reached the magazine for the forward turret. The gun crew brought up as many shells and propellant charges as could be stored in the working chamber below the turret. Shortly before, at 19:50,  Andreas Michelsen, aboard the cruiser , dispatched the torpedo boats of I Half-Flotilla to assist .  came alongside and took Hipper and his staff aboard, in order to transfer him to one of the other battlecruisers.  and  began laying a smoke screen between the battered ship and the British line, but at 20:15, before it was finished,  was struck in quick succession by four heavy-caliber shells. One pierced the ship's forward superfiring turret and temporarily disabled it. The shell detonated a propellant charge and the right gun was destroyed. The second hit disabled the electric training gear of the rearmost turret, which now had to be operated by hand. While Hipper was aboard G39, command of I Scouting Group temporarily fell to KzS Johannes Hartog.  fired her last shot at 20:45, at which point the smoke screen had successfully hidden her from the British line.

As the German fleet began to withdraw after nightfall, steaming at 15 knots, attempted to pass behind the German line to seek the safety of the disengaged side. Scheer hoped that in the foggy darkness,  could evade detection and successfully return to a German port. By 21:30, the ship was settling deeper into the sea. Water began to wash onto the deck and into the forecastle above the main armored deck; this would prove to be a significant problem. At midnight, there was still hope that the severely wounded  could make it back to harbor. The ship was capable of  up until around 00:45 when she began taking on more water. Critically, the forward main pumps were no longer usable, as the control rods had jammed.

By 01:00, there was too much water in the hull for the pumps to handle. Water began to enter the forward generator compartments, which forced the crew to work by candlelight.  was so low in the water by 01:30 that water began to flood the forward boiler room. By that point, almost all of the compartments in the forward part of the ship, up to the conning tower and below the main armored deck, were thoroughly flooded. Water had also entered the ship through shell holes in the forecastle above the armored deck; the majority of the upper portion of the ship forward of the forward-most barbette was flooded as well. The battlecruiser's crew attempted to patch the shell holes three times, but as the flooding worsened and the draft increased, water increasingly washed over the deck and inhibited progress on the repair work. The crew attempted to reverse direction and steam backwards, but this had to be abandoned when the bow became so submerged that the propellers were pulled partially out of the water; forward draft had increased to over 17 meters.

By 2:20, an estimated 8,000 tons of water was in the ship, and she was in serious danger of capsizing, so Harder gave the order to abandon ship. The torpedo boats G37, G38, G40, and V45 came alongside the stricken battlecruiser to evacuate the ship's crew, though six men were trapped in the bow and could not be freed. By 02:45  was submerged up to her bridge. G38 fired two torpedoes into the ship, and two minutes later she disappeared below the waves. The position of the wreck is estimated to be . During the battle,  had fired an estimated 380 main battery shells and 400 rounds from her secondary guns, as well as two torpedoes. In return, she was hit 24 times by British heavy-caliber shells.

In 2015, the survey ship  conducted an exploration of the area while laying a tide gauge. Echo took sonar images of the wreck, which her commander stated would "ensure the ship's final resting place is properly recognised as a war grave."

See also

 , for other warships named Lützow

Notes

Footnotes

Citations

References

Further reading
 
 
 

World War I battlecruisers of Germany
Derfflinger-class battlecruisers
1913 ships
Maritime incidents in 1916
Ships sunk at the Battle of Jutland
Ships built in Danzig
Ships built by Schichau